English First is a lobbying organization for the English-only movement in the United States founded in Springfield, Virginia in 1986 by Larry Pratt.

Further reading

See also
Federation for American Immigration Reform
English Plus

References

External links
 

English-only movement